Hilario López García (18 November 1907 – 17 June 1965) was a Mexican football forward who made three appearances for the Mexico at the 1930 FIFA World Cup.

Honours 
International
Central American and Caribbean Games Gold Medal (1): 1935

References

External links

1907 births
1965 deaths
Mexican footballers
Mexico international footballers
Footballers from Guadalajara, Jalisco
1930 FIFA World Cup players
Central American and Caribbean Games gold medalists for Mexico
Competitors at the 1935 Central American and Caribbean Games
Association football forwards
Club Necaxa footballers
Central American and Caribbean Games medalists in football
20th-century Mexican people